Star Company Basketball Cards were the only licensed NBA basketball cards being produced during the mid-1980s. Occupying a place vacated by sports card giant Topps, which ended its contractual relationship with the NBA and its Player's Association in 1982, Star began producing its colorful cards in mid-1983 with a 32 card All-Star set featuring stars from around the league who participated in the 1983 All-Star Game.

Star Company produced cards in limited quantities, with most production runs at or below 5,000 cards. Some card sets were made even more scarce by problems with quality control, particularly in the inaugural base set of 275 cards issued in 1983–84. Several of the teams in that set, most notably the Boston Celtics and Dallas Mavericks, saw less than twenty-five percent of their printed product (<1,000 cards) reach the market due to problems with ink saturation and miscutting of the cards.

Star cards were unlike any cards previously produced covering the NBA. They were sold in hobby shops by team in sealed, transparent plastic bags, known to many as "polybags." Cards were made available nationally through a small network of a half dozen so-called master distributors although some parts of the mid-west and various southern states received little attention among the distributor network. Many cards were initially purchased in response to ads in sports card magazines and even at various sporting events, including minor league baseball and hockey games. To this day, these cards are difficult to find due to the small print runs and non-standard distribution methods. These factors are also among the reasons the hobby does not view Star cards as traditional "rookie" cards, but instead considers them "extended rookies" or licensed cards published chronologically before a player's recognized rookie card. The 1986 Fleer set, published after most Star Company sets, remains the set viewed by most as listing the official rookie cards of many of the 1980s great players.

Authentication of these cards, a longtime problem for collectors as a result of issues with counterfeiting, has recently been bolstered by Beckett Grading Services (BGS), which began grading these cards in December, 2008. While some collectors still don't consider the Star Company cards as credible successors to the Topps sets of prior years, more so than at any time previously, hobbyists are accepting the legitimacy and historicity of these cards, due in part to the increase of information about the catalog of original cards and the efforts of grading companies like BGS and GAI (Global Authority, Inc.).

The Star Company catalog contains some of the most valuable basketball cards of the modern era.
In 2012, A BGS 9 1984-85 Star Michael Jordan XRC #101 sold on eBay for $9511.00 and a 
BGS 9 1984-85 Star Michael Jordan NBA Specials ROY #288 sold for $5,555.00.

Latest auction sold price as of 2017 for 1984-85 Star Michael Jordan XRC #101 sold for $31,100.00 on Apr 23, 2017 by PWCC Auctions and there were 2 reported private deals of the Rare Bulls Set 1984-85 Star Chicago Bulls Team Bag Set one graded at GAI 9 went for $52,000.00 and a lower grade of GAI 8.5 went for $39,000.00.

Trading cards